Tin foil is a thin metal foil.

Tin foil or tinfoil may also refer to:

a common misnomer for aluminium foil
Barbonymus, a genus of fish which are sometimes called tinfoils
Tinfoil, a novel by Mildred Cram
Tinfoil, original title of Faithless (1932 film), an adaptation of Cram's novel
"Tinfoil", an instrumental track on Living Things (Linkin Park album)
Tinfoil, a homebrew application for Nintendo Switch for managing installed games and installing NSP files, cheats and save files over internet.